Hardy Rogers Franklin (May 9, 1929 – August 22, 2004) was an American librarian and served as president of the American Library Association from 1993 to 1994.

Franklin received a bachelor's degree from Morehouse College and began a career as a teacher and librarian in Conyers, Georgia. He served as a librarian in the U.S. Army from 1953 to 1955 in Okinawa, Japan. He received a master's degree in library science from Atlanta University in 1956 and moved to New York to work at the Brooklyn Public Library. In 1971, after graduating from Rutgers University with a doctorate in library science, he taught at Queens College.

Franklin moved to Washington, D.C. in 1974 to lead the District of Columbia Public Library. In DC, he led an effort to dedicate a mural to the Reverend Martin Luther King Jr. and extended the library's online catalog to high schools and the University of the District of Columbia. Franklin established community libraries, an arts library and a weekly "dial-a-story" program.

Publications
 "Customer service : the heart of a library : inaugural address, June 30, 1993, New Orleans" (American Library Association, 1993)
 "Keeping Libraries Open" Paper presented at the American Library Association Annual Conference (95th, Chicago, Illinois, July 18–24, 1976) ERIC 127 996
 "Where Are We Going?" Paper presented at the American Library Association Annual Conference (95th, Chicago, Illinois, July 18–24, 1976) ERIC 127 997
 "The relationship between adult communication practices and public library use in a northern, urban, black ghetto" (1971)

References

 

1929 births
2004 deaths
American librarians
African-American librarians
Presidents of the American Library Association
Morehouse College alumni
Clark Atlanta University alumni
Rutgers University alumni
Queens College, City University of New York faculty
20th-century African-American people
21st-century African-American people